Macrobathra crococephala is a moth in the family Cosmopterigidae. It was described by Edward Meyrick in 1936. It is found in the Democratic Republic of the Congo.

References

Macrobathra
Moths described in 1936
Endemic fauna of the Democratic Republic of the Congo